The Pelican River is a river in Oneida County, Wisconsin.  The source is Pelican Lake and the mouth is the confluence with the Wisconsin River in Rhinelander.  Its name is a direct translation from the Ojibwe Zhede-ziibi.

The Pelican River was a travel artery for the Pelican Lake Band of the Ojibwe Indians when they needed to go to Lac du Flambeau or other central Ojibwe locations.

References

External links

Rivers of Wisconsin
Rivers of Oneida County, Wisconsin